Willem Benson (1521–1574), was a Flemish Renaissance painter.	
	
He was born in Bruges as the son of Ambrosius Benson, and was the brother of Jan, and the father of Ambrosius II.	
Benson's works are confused with Adriaen Isenbrant, and he was sometimes called Guillaume or Guillermo.	
He died in Middelburg.

References	
	

Willem Benson on Artnet	
	
	
	
	
	
1521 births	
1574 deaths	
Flemish Renaissance painters	
Artists from Bruges
Painters from Antwerp